Fat Music Volume 6: Uncontrollable Fatulence is the sixth compilation album in the "Fat Music" series, released by the Fat Wreck Chords record label, in 2002. The title is a pun on the medical condition of uncontrollable flatulence.

Track listing
 "presenting: the dancing machine (il robot con la testa di scimmia)" - The Lawrence Arms
 "Back to the Motor League" - Propagandhi
 "Leavin'" - Mad Caddies
 "file under 'ADULT URBAN CONTEMPORARY'" - Dillinger Four
 "Never Stops" - Lagwagon
 "Your Worst Mistake" - Strung Out
 "Generation Lost" - Rise Against
 "Friends of the Enemy" - No Use for a Name
 "Blue Times Two" - Avail
 "Sign in a Window" - Swingin' Utters
 "Faction" - Less Than Jake
 "Cocksucker" - Frenzal Rhomb
 "Federation" - Anti-Flag
 "Mattersville" - NOFX
 "Built to Last" - Sick of it All
 "I Hate You" - Wizo
 "Yesterday's Headlines" - Good Riddance
 "Nothing Compares 2 U" - Me First and the Gimme Gimmes

See also
 Fat Wreck Chords compilations

Fat Music compilations
2002 compilation albums